St. Elizabeth's Church in Marburg, Germany, was built by the Order of the Teutonic Knights in honour of Saint Elizabeth of Hungary. Her tomb made the church an important pilgrimage destination during the late Middle Ages.

Architecture 

The church is one of the earliest purely Gothic churches in German-speaking areas, and is held to be a model for the architecture of Cologne Cathedral. It is built from sandstone in a cruciform layout. The nave and its flanking aisles have a vaulted ceiling more than 20 m (66 ft) high. The triple choir consists of the Elisabeth choir, the High choir and the Landgrave choir. The crossing is separated from the nave by a stone rood screen. In earlier times, the front part of the church had been reserved for the knights of the Order. The church has two towers with an approximate height of 80 m (263 ft). The northern one is crowned by a star, the southern one by a knight. It served as an inspiration for St. Paul's Church in Strasbourg.

The Gothic shrine of St. Elizabeth is the most important treasure of the church, but other pieces of religious art are also exhibited.

History 

Construction started in 1235, the year Saint Elizabeth was canonized. The church was consecrated in 1283. However, the towers were not finished until 1340. The church was the property of the Order of the Teutonic Knights; some buildings of the Order still exist near the church, among them the Deutschhausgut, which now houses the mineral collection and the department of geography of the Philipps University of Marburg.

Until the 16th century, the Landgraves of Hesse were buried in the church. In the context of the Reformation, Philip I, Landgrave of Hesse had Elizabeth's remains removed, in order to deter pilgrims from the Protestant city of Marburg. Today, relics of Elizabeth can be found in St. Elizabeth Convent in Vienna, and in Košice. The Reliquary of St. Elizabeth is in the Swedish History Museum, Stockholm.

Most of the knights and clerics of the Order who were attached to the church converted to Protestantism during the 16th century, and the church was used for Protestant services from that point on. For a short time at the beginning of the 19th century, both Catholic Mass and Protestant communion services were celebrated in separate parts of the church.

After World War II, former German president Paul von Hindenburg and his wife were buried in the Elizabeth Church, after the removal of their remains from a salt mine where they were hidden under orders of their son Oskar von Hindenburg to protect them from Soviet Forces, later to be found by the US Army, and finally put to rest in this 13th-century church.

Recent developments 

In order to start a long-needed renovation of the church and the remodelling of its immediate neighbourhood, the Stiftung Heilige Elisabeth foundation was established in 2004 and supports the City of Marburg and the Protestant Church of Hesse-Kassel and Waldeck in the financing of the repair measures.

See also 
 Konrad von Marburg

References 

 Hermann Bauer: Sankt Elisabeth und die Elisabethkirche zu Marburg. Marburg, Hitzeroth 1990  
 Andreas Köstler: Die Ausstattung der Marburger Elisabethkirche. Zur Ästhetisierung des Kultraums im Mittelalter. Berlin, Reimer 1995  
 Eberhard Leppin: Die Elisabethkirche in Marburg an der Lahn. Königstein, Langwiesche 1999

External links 

 St. Elizabeth's Church 

Buildings and structures in Marburg
Marburg, St Elisabeth's
Marburg
Churches completed in 1340
Burial sites of the House of Hesse